Gaylord is a city in and the county seat of Otsego County in the U.S. state of Michigan. Gaylord had a population of 4,286 at the 2020 census, an increase from 3,645 at the 2010 census.

Gaylord styles itself as an "alpine village" and contains many buildings in the downtown area with Tyrolean style motifs. Receiving abundant snowfall and experiencing mild summer temperatures, the area around Gaylord has long been known for its many skiing and golf resorts, one of the largest such concentrations in the Midwestern United States.

Gaylord was struck by an EF3 tornado on May 20, 2022.  The tornado killed two people and injured 44 others.  It was the first recorded tornado in Gaylord since tornado records began in 1950.

History

Originally called Barnes, Gaylord was named for an attorney employed with the Michigan Central Railroad. The town of Gaylord was established when the Jackson, Lansing, and  Saginaw Railroads pushed north from Otsego Lake Village in 1873. All property north of Main Street was owned by the railroad.  Orlando M. Barnes owned all of the property to the south.  Interestingly, Main Street was the borderline for two townships. This  put the northern half of the new community in Livingston Township  and the southern portion in Bagley Township.

The year the “Village of Gaylord” was officially platted (1874), it  also was granted a post office of the same name. So, if the community  was truly ever named Barnes, the name change would have occurred between November 1873 and October 1874. Note: Today the term "village" has a legal definition for a specific form of local government.  Technically, Gaylord didn’t become a village until March 4, 1881, when incorporated by act of the State of Michigan Legislature. The person for whom the town was re-named, Augustine Smith Gaylord, was an attorney  associated with the Michigan  Central Railroad. His law firm was located in Saginaw. Mr. Gaylord never lived in his namesake town, but he did own property in Hayes Township.  His distinguished career included serving as a school teacher,  church choir director, county  clerk, and member of the State  Legislature.  In 1875, Mr. Gaylord was appointed to serve as an attorney for the  United States Department of the Interior. At the request of President Grant, Mr. Gaylord was assigned to negotiate a treaty with Native  Americans in Montana and the Dakotas. It is believed this trip may  have been too strenuous for Mr. Gaylord’s pre-existing health  conditions. Declining health prevented him from returning to Washington, D.C. Mr. Gaylord died at his home in Saginaw in 1877 at  the age of 46. That same year, Gaylord became the county seat – the location of  government and judicial transactions. Prior to 1877, Otsego Lake  Village had been designated the temporary county seat. Gaylord’s central location in the county, along with its growing business  community, prompted the change.

In 1879, the state legislature appropriated state-owned lands to be exchanged for construction of a state road from Petoskey through Berryville to Gaylord. These lands were originally conveyed to the State of Michigan by the Federal government in 1850 by the Swamp Land Act of 1850.

In 1905, a marketing campaign was undertaken to attract outside  business investors and new residents to locate in Gaylord. A 38-page  photo booklet entitled “Gaylord Illustrated” was published to showcase  the many benefits of living in the town located on the 45th parallel in  Michigan’s Lower Peninsula. Among the many photographs featured in  the booklet were the Otsego County Courthouse and the  Dayton Last Block Works. The Dayton Last Block Works was located south and west of  downtown Gaylord between the Michigan Central Railroad and U.S. 27.  It was bordered on the south by Wisconsin Avenue, and to the north by Third Street. The 14-acre industrial site included 27 buildings, and the  owners claimed it to be the largest factory of its kind in world. The  company, headquartered in Dayton Ohio, operated its Gaylord branch from 1895 to 1931. Otsego County hardwoods were used to produce  wooden shoe forms, bowling pins, and golf club heads. One of the original brick buildings stands still today on South Otsego Avenue as the Bavarian Office complex.

A second railroad, the Boyne City, Gaylord and Alpena (BC,G&A),  reached Gaylord in 1906. This provided east-west rail travel and  transportation. The tracks entered Gaylord from Hallock from the northeast. The BC,G&A shared the Michigan Central  Railroad depot on Michigan Avenue. Heading east, the tracks paralleled Fourth Street and headed toward the town of Sparr.

Another important manufacturing venture in Gaylord’s past was the Gaylord Motor Car Company. Formed in 1910 by local investors who  had dreams of becoming the next Detroit, the company offered four innovative styles designed to compete with other automakers.  Approximately 350 cars were produced before the company went bankrupt in 1913. Only one Gaylord car exists today: It is on display at the Visitors Center in downtown Gaylord.

Gaylord became a city in 1922. The change from village to city required a vote by town residents. For reasons that are unclear, the margin of passage was a very close 21 votes — 114 people in favor to 93 against.  John Hamilton was elected the first mayor of Gaylord. Over the years, the community continued to grow, in part, because of its location. Gaylord’s Main Street was the intersection of U.S. 27 and  M-32. These major roads brought both through-traffic and travelers to Gaylord. Gas stations, restaurants, and lodging establishments sprung up to accommodate local shoppers as well as visitors enjoying the area’s attractions. Long before Gaylord was the Alpine Village or the Golf Mecca, it promoted itself as the Top of Michigan and, later, the ski capital of  Michigan. Both of these marketing endeavors were based on the area's natural features and reflected the importance of tourism as an economic development strategy. With an altitude of 1,394 feet above sea level,  Gaylord held the distinction of being the city of highest elevation in  Michigan’s Lower Peninsula. The abundant winter snowfall and steep hills nearby made downhill skiing a logical focus for efforts to attract recreational visitors to the area.

2022 tornado
On May 20, 2022, an EF3 tornado with winds of  struck the city killing two people and injuring 44.  There was major damage to several businesses and a mobile home park. Incumbent Michigan governor Gretchen Whitmer declared a state of emergency for the Gaylord area and stated that Lansing will provide reconstruction to Gaylord. This tornado was the first to hit the city since records began in 1950.

Geography
Gaylord experiences heavy lake effect snow during the winter and is in the middle of the Northern Michigan snowbelt.
Highway signs denote that Gaylord rests on the 45th parallel line – halfway between the equator and the North Pole.  This is one of 29 places (six are in Michigan) in the U.S. where such signs are known to exist.
It is considered to be part of Northern Michigan.
Hartwick Pines State Park is just  to the south, and is one of the last remaining stands of old growth virgin Eastern white pine forest.
The Huron-Manistee National Forests is nearby.

Climate
This climatic region has large seasonal temperature differences, with warm to hot (and often humid) summers and cold (sometimes severely cold) winters.  According to the Köppen Climate Classification system, Gaylord has a humid continental climate, abbreviated "Dfb" on climate maps.

Demographics

2010 census
As of the census of 2010, there were 3,645 people, 1,610 households, and 826 families residing in the city. The racial makeup of the city was 94.8% White, 0.9% African American, 0.8% Native American, 1.0% Asian, 0.2% from other races, and 2.3% from two or more races. Hispanic or Latino of any race were 1.8% of the population.

There were 1,610 households, of which 27.8% had children under the age of 18 living with them, 33.7% were married couples living together, 13.5% had a female householder with no husband present, 4.1% had a male householder with no wife present, and 48.7% were non-families. 42.0% of all households were made up of individuals, and 19.1% had someone living alone who was 65 years of age or older. The average household size was 2.14 and the average family size was 2.95.

The median age in the city was 39.3 years. 22.7% of residents were under the age of 18; 10.9% were between the ages of 18 and 24; 23.2% were from 25 to 44; 23.2% were from 45 to 64; and 20% were 65 years of age or older. The gender makeup of the city was 45.9% male and 54.1% female.

2000 census
As of the census of 2000, there were 3,681 people, 1,584 households, and 888 families residing in the city. The racial makeup of the city was 96.50% White, 0.30% African American, 0.95% Native American, 0.30% Asian, 0.08% Pacific Islander, 0.33% from other races, and 1.55% from two or more races. Hispanic or Latino of any race were 1.71% of the population.

There were 1,584 households, out of which 29.0% had children under the age of 18 living with them, 38.8% were married couples living together, 13.4% had a female householder with no husband present, and 43.9% were non-families. 38.1% of all households were made up of individuals, and 19.0% had someone living alone who was 65 years of age or older. The average household size was 2.22 and the average family size was 2.97.

In the city, the population was spread out, with 24.9% under the age of 18, 9.4% from 18 to 24, 26.6% from 25 to 44, 18.6% from 45 to 64, and 20.4% who were 65 years of age or older.  The median age was 38 years. For every 100 females, there were 79.4 males.  For every 100 females age 18 and over, there were 76.0 males.

The median income for a household in the city was $28,770, and the median income for a family was $36,654. Males had a median income of $33,264 versus $19,815 for females. The per capita income for the city was $17,313.  About 8.8% of families and 9.7% of the population were below the poverty line, including 8.8% of those under age 18 and 13.6% of those age 65 or over.

Transportation
 passes to the west of the city and connects with the Mackinac Bridge to the north and Saginaw and Detroit to the south
 is a loop route running through Gaylord. It follows the former route of US 27, in part, and was commissioned in 1986. The highway returns to I-75.
 passes east–west through the city.  Although it is not a true 'cross-peninsular' highway—crosses the lower peninsula from Lake Michigan to Lake Huron—it is close.
 terminates at M-32 west of the city. It originates at US 131 in Alba.
 begins at BL I-75 (Old US 27) south of the city and proceeds easterly to M-32 southeast of Gaylord.
 begins at M-32 east of the city and continues easterly through Sparr to F-01.
Old 27 is the former route of US 27 and is a major north–south local route through the city and the rest of Otsego County.
Gaylord Regional Airport is located at 1100 Aero Drive, Gaylord, MI 49735.  (989) 732-4218 Phone.  It is owned and operated by the County of Otsego.  The Airport is licensed by the Michigan Aeronautics Commission as a General Utility Airport.  It is listed as a tier one airport in all categories of the Michigan Airport System Plan.
Indian Trails provides daily intercity bus service between St. Ignace and East Lansing, Michigan.

Recreation

Gaylord sees significant snowfall during winter due to its elevation and its location in the path of lake-effect snow produced by Lake Michigan. Combined with local terrain and topography, many winter recreation opportunities abound.
 Much of the old train system has been converted to trails for biking or Snow Mobile riding.  The North Central State Trail north to Mackinaw City is a Rails to trails converted remnant of a spur line of the Michigan Central Railroad that used to serve Gaylord.
 Fall colors and snowshoeing are highlights in several of the local parks.
 Cross country skiing is an important tourist activity near Gaylord.  With two of the top-rated cross country venues in Michigan, namely Hartwick Pines State Park Trails and Mason Tract Pathway nearby.  Forbush corners in nearby Frederic, Michigan is a world-recognized center for education and training in cross country skiing, and benefits from early and late snow due to a 'snow belt micro climate.'  Accomplished amateur ski racer David Forbush designed, maintains, and grooms "one of the finest privately owned systems in the Midwest."
 Downhill skiing and snowboarding are also highly accessible with several resorts operating in the area.
 Water skiing, wakeboarding, and jetskiing are also available on Otsego Lake.
 Otsego Lake State Park, swimming, boating, and camping.
 Otsego Club & Resort

An annual event in July, Alpenfest, encourages participants to dress in traditional Swiss fashions. This event brings in numerous people from all around and provides a vast array of activities. Some of these activities include carnival rides and games, music, shops, and a local 'Queen's Pageant'. A parade takes place on the final day.

Twin town
Gaylord is twinned with the Swiss town of Pontresina.

Media
Local newspaper Gaylord Herald Times serves the area.
Regionally available is the Weekly Choice Publication.
WMJZ, "Eagle" 101.5 FM, features a classic hits format and is the primary local (Gaylord/Otsego County-focused) commercial radio station.  
Also licensed to Gaylord are WBLW 88.1 FM of Grace Baptist Church and WPHN 90.5 FM (The Promise FM), which both feature non-commercial Christian religious programming.  Also, Charlevoix-based Catholic radio station WTCK operates a translator in Gaylord at 92.1 FM.
WSRT 106.7 FM, a talk radio station (formerly WKPK "The Peak," a locally legendary top 40 station) which, although licensed to Gaylord, is based in Traverse City.
WQON, Q100.3, The Only Place for Rock & Roll and play-by-play for Detroit Lions Football and University of Michigan Football/Basketball.
WGRY AM/FM, Y101.1/AM1230, YOUR Sports Talk in Northern Michigan, CBS Sports Talk and home of Detroit Tiger Baseball, Detroit Red Wing Hockey, and Detroit Pistons Basketball.

Gaylord is also served by radio and TV broadcasts from Traverse City, Petoskey, Charlevoix, Cadillac, Grayling, Houghton Lake, Cheboygan, and Alpena.

Notable people 
 Claude Shannon, the "father of information theory"

References

External links
 
 Gaylord Area Convention & Tourism Bureau

 
Cities in Otsego County, Michigan
County seats in Michigan
Populated places established in 1874
1874 establishments in Michigan